{{DISPLAYTITLE:C28H40O8}}
The molecular formula C28H40O8 (molar mass: 504.61 g/mol, exact mass: 504.2723 u) may refer to:

 Phorbol 12,13-dibutyrate (PDBu)
 Taxusin